Mallaury Nataf (aka Mallory Nataf) (born Marie-Laurence Nataf, 19 March 1972) is a French singer and actress.

Biography

Personal life
Mallaury Nataf was born in Lille, France.  She spent her childhood between Lille and Nice and her parents divorced when she was young. Before playing in television shows, she attended law and business studies.

Career
She began her career in the sitcom Le Miel et les Abeilles, produced by AB Productions in late 1992 until 1994. 
Like other AB Productions like Hélène Rolles, she released a track single produced by AB Productions (Les Filles, c'est très compliqué).

In spring 1994, she sang her title Fleur sauvage without underwear under her short dress on a children show - the Jacky Show - and images from the show triggered a public scandal. 
Late 1994, she left Le Miel et les Abeilles and decided to get out from the AB Productions system.

Then she played in some movies for television,  like Une femme explosive (1996) with Roger Hanin and she played in the first ten episodes of  Saint Tropez (Sous le soleil into French television) in 1996 .

She also played in the movie Les Deux Papas et la Maman with Smaïn, Arielle Dombasle and Antoine de Caunes.

In 1998, she hosted Cinémascope on the musical cable channel MCM.

She released a CD for children during the Christmas holidays in 1999: Malorie Noël 2000. She played a dozen of theatre pieces from 1992 to 2000. In 2001, she re-attended law studies for some months.

In spring 2005, she was one of the contestants of the real TV  la Ferme Célébrités 2 on TF1,  and she was eliminated at the end of the first week, she also played in the movie ADN from Judith Cahen.

Her life has since taken an unfortunate turn; in February 2012, she admitted in an interview with Le Parisien that she was homeless, and that her two oldest children had been put into the custody of their respective fathers.  Later, she and her youngest son, Shiloh, were found by Parisian police sleeping in the road in the 3rd arrondissement in Paris.  They were not immediately recognized, but later were identified, and 3 year old Shiloh was taken out of his mother's custody.

Filmography

Singer
1993: Les filles c'est très compliqué, single (+ Fleur sauvage)
2000: Malorie Noël 2000

Private life
In the 1990s, she dated Hervé Noel, a former TV presenter and actor.

In 1998, she gave birth to a boy called Raphaël and in 2000, she gave birth to a girl named Angeline In July 2009, she gave birth at home to a boy with her new boyfriend called Abraham.

References

External links

French film actresses
French television actresses
La Ferme Célébrités participants
Musicians from Lille
1972 births
Living people
21st-century French singers
21st-century French women singers